The 2018–19 Biathlon World Cup (BWC) was a multi-race series over a season of biathlon, organised by the International Biathlon Union. The season started on 2 December 2018 in Pokljuka, Slovenia and ended on 24 March 2019 in Oslo Holmenkollen, Norway. The defending overall champions from the 2017–18 Biathlon World Cup were Martin Fourcade of France and Kaisa Mäkäräinen of Finland.

Calendar
Below is the IBU World Cup calendar for the 2018–19 season.

World Cup podiums

Men

Women

Men's team

Women's team

Mixed

Standings (men)

Overall 

Final standings after 25 races.

Individual 

Final standings after 3 races.

Sprint 

Final standings after 9 races.

Pursuit 

Final standings after 8 races.

Mass start 

Final standings after 5 races.

Relay 

Final standings after 5 races.

Nation 

Final standings after 23 races.

Standings (women)

Overall 

Final standings after 25 races.

Individual 

 Final standings after 3 races.

Sprint 

Final standings after 9 races.

Pursuit 

Final standings after 8 races.

Mass start 

Final standings after 5 races.

Relay 

Final standings after 5 races.

Nation 

Final standings after 23 races.

Standings: Mixed

Mixed relay 

Final standings after 6 races.

Medal table

Achievements
First World Cup career victory

Men
 , 26, in his 5th season — Stage 4 Sprint in Oberhof; first podium was 2012–13 Pursuit in Oslo Holmenkollen
 , 26, in his 6th season — Stage 6 Mass Start in Anterselva; first podium was 2014–15 Mass Start in Ruhpolding
 , 26, in his 7th season — Stage 8 Sprint in Salt Lake City; first podium was 2018–19 Pursuit in Hochfilzen
 , 27, in his 7th season — World Championships Pursuit in Östersund; it also was his first podium

Women
 , 28, in her 7th season — Stage 1 Individual in Pokljuka; first podium was 2013–14 Pursuit in Hochfilzen
 , 28, in her 7th season — Stage 3 Sprint in Nové Město; first podium was 2015–16 Sprint in Khanty-Mansiysk
 , 23, in her 5th season — Stage 4 Sprint in Oberhof; first podium was 2016–17 Pursuit in Kontiolahti
 , 24, in her 6th season — Stage 5 Mass start in Ruhpolding; first podium was 2014–15 Mass start in Ruhpolding
 , 22, in her 3rd season — Stage 6 Sprint in Anterselva; first podium was 2018–19 Individual in Pokljuka
 , 23, in her 3rd season — World Championships Individual in Östersund; first podium was 2018–19 Pursuit in Nové Město

First World Cup podium

Men
 , 27, in his 6th season — no. 2 in the Stage 1 Individual in Pokljuka 
 , 26, in his 7th season — no. 3 in the Stage 2 Pursuit in Hochfilzen 
 , 23, in his 2nd season — no. 3 in the Stage 3 Sprint in Nové Město 
 , 21, in his 2nd season — no. 3 in the Stage 4 Sprint in Oberhof
 , 25, in his 3rd season — no. 3 in the Stage 8 Sprint in Salt Lake City
 , 31, in his 13th season — no. 2 in the World Championships Individual in Östersund

Women
 , 21, in her 3rd season — no. 3 in the Stage 1 Individual in Pokljuka
 , 23, in her 3rd season — no. 3 in the Stage 3 Pursuit in Nové Město
 , 22, in her 4th season — no. 2 in the Stage 5 Mass start in Ruhpolding
 , 31, in her 5th season — no. 3 in the Stage 9 Mass start in Oslo Holmenkollen

Victory in this World Cup (all-time number of victories in parentheses)

Men
 , 16 (37) first places
 , 2 (72) first places
 , 2 (2) first places
 , 1 (9) first place
 , 1 (2) first place
 , 1 (1) first place
 , 1 (1) first place
 , 1 (1) first place

Women
 , 5 (16) first places
 , 3 (26) first places
 , 3 (7) first places
 , 3 (3) first places
 , 2 (4) first places
 , 2 (2) first places
 , 2 (2) first places
 , 1 (20) first place
 , 1 (6) first place
 , 1 (1) first place
 , 1 (1) first place
 , 1 (1) first place

Retirements
The following notable biathletes retired during or after the 2018–19 season:

Men
 
 
 
 
 
 
 
 
 
 
 
 
 
 
 
 
 

Women

Notes

References

External links
IBU official site

 
Biathlon World Cup
2018 in biathlon
2019 in biathlon